Celeste Brown may refer to:

 Celeste Brown (ice hockey) (born 1992), American ice hockey player
 Celeste Brown (swimmer) (born 1994), Cook Islands swimmer